Windows User (1991–1996) was the first UK computer magazine for end-users of the Microsoft Windows operating system.

It was published by Reed Business Publishing, designed by Phil Brooker, and edited by Sean Geer who later went on to edit the UK edition of Wired. Regular contributors included Mike Hardaker, Mark Stephens, Andrew Brown (author of ‘The Darwin Wars’), Tim Nott and Glyn Moody.

Despite its unprepossessing subject matter, it gained a reputation for being both cultured and funny. 

It had no editorial connection with the middle-eastern or US publications of the same name.

References

1991 establishments in the United Kingdom
1996 disestablishments in the United Kingdom
Defunct computer magazines published in the United Kingdom
Magazines established in 1991
Magazines disestablished in 1996
Microsoft Windows magazines